Shivpal Singh Yadav (born 16 February 1955) is a politician from Uttar Pradesh, India. He was born in Saifai village, Etawah district, and is a younger brother of Samajwadi Party leader late Mulayam Singh Yadav and uncle of the former Chief Minister of Uttar Pradesh, Akhilesh Yadav. He is a Member of the Uttar Pradesh Legislative Assembly, representing the Jaswantnagar seat in Etawah district, from 1996 till now. He is also National General Secretary of Samajwadi Party, at which he was appointed on 29 January 2023.

In 2018 he founded his own party named  Pragatisheel Samajwadi Party (Lohiya), which was merged into Samajwadi Party in 2022.

Early life and education
Shivpal Singh Yadav was born in Saifai village, Etawah district in 1955 to Sughar Singh Yadav and Murti Devi. He has studied in Kanpur University's K.K. P.G. College, Etawah and University of Lucknow's Lucknow Christian College and earned BA (1976) and BPEd (1977) degrees respectively.

Family

Shivpal is the youngest among 5 brothers. Ratan Singh Yadav, Mulayam Singh Yadav, Abhay Ram Yadav and Rajpal Singh Yadav are his elder brothers. He has 1 sister Kamla Devi Yadav.

Rajya Sabha MP Ram Gopal Yadav and his sister Geeta Yadav are his cousins.

Career 
Shivpal Singh Yadav is the MLA from the Jaswantnagar constituency since 1996.

Yadav was the leader of Opposition in Uttar Pradesh Assembly since 2007 during the Mayawati regime.

Positions held
Shivpal Singh Yadav has served 6 times as MLA. He had lost the 17th Lok Sabha election from Firozabad in 2019.

Personal life
Shivpal Singh Yadav is married to Mrs. Sarla Yadav since 1981 and they have a son Aditya Yadav and daughter Dr. Anubha Yadav. Anubha Yadav is married to Ajay Yadav who is an IAS officer of 2010 batch and Tamil Nadu cadre.

Educational organizations
He established schools named S.S. Memorial Senior Secondary Public School, Saifai and Sughar Singh Memorial Shiksha Niketan Inter College, Saifai in 1990s, in the memory of his father. He is manager of colleges Chaudhary Charan Singh Post Graduate College and Chaudhary Charan Singh College of Law, both established by his elder brother Mulayam Singh Yadav. He also established a teachers' training college named S.S. Memorial Educational Academy, Saifai in 2012 and a degree college named S.S. Memorial Mahavidyalaya, Takha in 2013. As of March 2023, he is manager of 6 schools and 4 colleges, which include one CBSE Board school, 5 State Board schools, 2 multidisciplinary (degree/post graduate) colleges, one law college and one teachers' training college. He is in process to establish a pharmacy college named S.S. Memorial College of Pharmacy, Saifai right now.

References 

1954 births
Living people
People from Saifai
Uttar Pradesh MLAs 2007–2012
Samajwadi Party politicians
Chhatrapati Shahu Ji Maharaj University alumni
University of Lucknow alumni
Leaders of the Opposition in the Uttar Pradesh Legislative Assembly
Shivpal
Uttar Pradesh MLAs 2017–2022
Pragatisheel Samajwadi Party (Lohiya) politicians
Uttar Pradesh MLAs 2022–2027
Samajwadi Party politicians from Uttar Pradesh